Nohor Ram Gupta, professionally known as Bhawani Bhikshu was a Nepali writer, poet, literary journalist, academic and novelist. He has written multiple novels and short stories. Aagat, a novel published in 1975 is one of his best known books.

Early life and education 
He was born as Nohor Ram Gupta on 3 June 1914 (Jestha 21, 1966 BS) in Taulihawa, Kapilvastu, Nepal to mother Yashoda Devi Kalwar Gupta and father Indra Prasad Gupta.  At the age of 4, he suffered from smallpox. His parents prayed to goddess Durga for his wellbeing. After he recovered, they changed his name to Bhawani in honour of the goddess. 

After completing his education till fourth grade in a language school in his village, he was sent to his maternal house in India. He gave Hindi-medium Kulbhusan examination at the age of 12 in India in which he received the second position. After completing his education, he started working as a copywriter in a Nepalese government office. He started being interested in writing in Nepali during his time as a copywriter.

Literary career 
He worked as the editor of Sharada magazine in 1951. He worked for Royal Nepal Academy after its establishment in 1957. He received the prestigious Madan Puraskar for his novel Aagat in 1975 (2032 BS). He also won the Sajha Puraskar for the same novel.

Notable works 
Short stories collection

 Tyo Pheri Pharkala ? and Other Stories
 Gunakeshari (1953)
 Maiyasaheb (1960)
 Avarta (Whirlpool, 1967)
 Avaantar

Novels

 Subhadra Bajya (2019)
 Aagat (2033)
 Pipe no. Dui (2032)
 Behind the Scenes (2030)
Poetry collections

 Chhaya
 Prakash
 Parishkar

Personal life 
He married twice but both of his marriage was unsuccessful. He died on 16 April 1981 in Kathmandu, Nepal.

See also
List of Nepali writers
Riddhi Bahadur Malla
Madan Mani Dixit

References

Nepalese male writers
Sajha Puraskar winners
Madan Puraskar winners
20th-century Nepalese writers
People from Kapilvastu District
1914 births
1981 deaths
Nepalese short story writers
Nepalese male novelists
Nepalese academics
Nepalese Hindus